Painton (also Paradise) is an unincorporated community in northern Stoddard County, Missouri, United States. It is located twenty miles north of Dexter.

A post office called Painton has been in operation since 1918. The community has the name of Albert Painton, a local merchant.

References

Unincorporated communities in Stoddard County, Missouri
Unincorporated communities in Missouri
1918 establishments in Missouri